The scope listed in the table is prefecture-level cities, including direct-administered municipality and special administrative regions that are equivalent in area and economic volume. The unit of measurement for the data listed is the local currency Chinese yuan. In order to facilitate international comparison, the local currency is converted into US dollars and the purchasing power parity (int'l dollar).

Methodology 
Shown here are GDP figures publicized in provincial-level Statistical Yearbooks or official statistical communiques.

All GDP figures are based on the national currency Chinese yuan (code:CN¥). For an easy comparison they are converted into US dollars according to official average annual exchange rates, purchasing power parity (PPP) according to comparison of IMF WEO figures.

2021 list

See also 

 Economy of China
 Historical GDP of China
 List of Chinese administrative divisions by GDP
 List of Chinese administrative divisions by GDP per capita
 List of Chinese prefecture-level cities by GDP per capita
 Prefecture-level city
 List of cities in China by population
 List of cities in China
 List of twin towns and sister cities in China
 List of capitals in China
 Sub-provincial division
 List of country subdivisions by GDP over 200 billion US dollars
 List of renminbi exchange rates
 Provincial city
 Administrative divisions of China
 Global city

References

Prefecture Level Cities By Gdp
Cities By Gdp
Chinese prefecture-level cities by GDP
Prefecture Level Cities By Gdp
Lists of cities by GDP